South Broad Street Row is a national historic district located at Mooresville, Iredell County, North Carolina.  It encompasses six contributing buildings in a predominantly residential section of Mooresville, with notable examples of Late Victorian style architecture. They are the former First Presbyterian Church Manse (1891), Dr. James Young House (c. 1890), Tom Hall House (c. 1895), John Pinkney Mills House, J. Frank Brawley House (c. 1914), and the Johnston Family House.

It was listed on the National Register of Historic Places in 1980.

References

Houses on the National Register of Historic Places in North Carolina
Historic districts on the National Register of Historic Places in North Carolina
Victorian architecture in North Carolina
Geography of Iredell County, North Carolina
National Register of Historic Places in Iredell County, North Carolina
Houses in Iredell County, North Carolina